Benjamin Harrison Van Dyke (August 15, 1888 – October 22, 1973) was a pitcher in Major League Baseball who played for the Philadelphia Phillies and Boston Red Sox. He was born in Clintonville, Pennsylvania. 
 
In a two-season career, Van Dyke posted a 3.32 ERA in five games, including one start, three games finished, 13 strikeout, 11 walks, 20 hits allowed and  innings of work, without a decision or saves.

Van Dyke was a member of the 1912 American League champion Red Sox, although he did not play in the World Series.

He died at the age of 85 in Sarasota, Florida.

See also
1912 Boston Red Sox season

External links

1888 births
1973 deaths
Major League Baseball pitchers
Baseball players from Pennsylvania
Philadelphia Phillies players
Boston Red Sox players
Worcester Busters players